920 Rogeria (prov. designation:  or ) is a dark background asteroid from the central region of the asteroid belt, discovered by German astronomer Karl Reinmuth at the Heidelberg-Königstuhl State Observatory on 1 September 1919. It was named "Rogeria", a name unrelated to the discoverer's contemporaries, that was taken from the almanac Lahrer Hinkender Bote.

Orbit and classification 

Rogeria, located in the orbital region of the Eunomia family, is a non-family asteroid of the main belt's background population when applying the hierarchical clustering method to its proper orbital elements. It orbits the Sun in the central asteroid belt at a distance of 2.3–2.9 AU once every 4 years and 3 months (1,552 days; semi-major axis of 2.62 AU). Its orbit has an eccentricity of 0.11 and an inclination of 12° with respect to the ecliptic. The body's observation arc begins at Heidelberg Observatory with its official discovery observation.

Naming 

This minor planet was named after the feminine form of the name "Roger", picked from the Lahrer Hinkender Bote, which was published in Lahr, southern Germany. A Hinkender Bote (lit. "limping messenger") was a very popular almanac, especially in the alemannic-speaking region from the late 17th throughout the early 20th century. The calendar section contains feast days, the dates of important fairs and astronomical ephemerides. For 5 January, the calendar gives "Roger" as the German name day analogue next to Simeon and Telesph., the protestant and catholic entries in the calendar of saints, likely referring to Simeon Stylites and Pope Telesphorus.

Reinmuth's calendar names 

As with 22 other asteroids – starting with 913 Otila, and ending with 1144 Oda – Reinmuth selected names from this calendar due to his many asteroid discoveries that he had trouble thinking of proper names. These names are not related to the discoverer's contemporaries. Lutz Schmadel, the author of the Dictionary of Minor Planet Names learned about Reinmuth's source of inspiration from private communications with Dutch astronomer Ingrid van Houten-Groeneveld, who worked as a young astronomer at Heidelberg.

Physical characteristics 

In the Tholen classification, Rogeria is closest to a dark D-type and somewhat similar to an uncommon T-type asteroid, though with an unusual spectrum (DTU). D-type asteroids are more common further out the asteroid belt and among the Jupiter trojan population. In the SDSS-based taxonomy, Rogeria is an X-type asteroid.

Rotation period and poles 

In October 2010, a rotational lightcurve of Rogeria was obtained from photometric observations by Thomas A. Polakis at the Command Module Observatory  in Arizona. Lightcurve analysis gave a rotation period of  hours with a brightness variation of  magnitude. A tentative period determination of  hours with an amplitude of  magnitude was made by French amateur French astronomer René Roy in July 2012. Another observation by Petr Pravec and Peter Kušnirák at Ondřejov Observatory in June 2007 gave a period of 8.09 hours.

In 2016, a modeled lightcurve gave a concurring sidereal period of  hours using data from the Uppsala Asteroid Photometric Catalogue, the Palomar Transient Factory survey, and individual observers (such as above), as well as sparse-in-time photometry from the NOFS, the Catalina Sky Survey, and the La Palma surveys . The study also determined two spin axes of (238.0°, −15.0°) and (47.0°, −35.0°) in ecliptic coordinates (λ, β).

Diameter and albedo 

The Collaborative Asteroid Lightcurve Link derives an albedo of 0.0613 and a diameter of 29.71 km based on an absolute magnitude of 11.285.

Notes

References

External links 
 Lightcurve Database Query (LCDB), at www.minorplanet.info
 Dictionary of Minor Planet Names, Google books
 Asteroids and comets rotation curves, CdR – Geneva Observatory, Raoul Behrend
 Discovery Circumstances: Numbered Minor Planets (1)-(5000) – Minor Planet Center
 
 

000920
Discoveries by Karl Wilhelm Reinmuth
Named minor planets
000920
19190901